The 224th Coastal Division was an infantry division of the Royal Italian Army during World War II. Royal Italian Army coastal divisions were second line divisions formed with reservists and equipped with second rate materiel. They were often commanded by officers called out of retirement.

History 
In November 1942 Axis forces invaded Southern France and divided it into a German and an Italian occupation zone. For the coastal defense of its zone Italy raised on 1 January 1943 the 223rd Coastal Division in Bologna and the 224th Coastal Division in Florence. Both divisions were formed with reserve units of the army's regular Alpini regiments.

The 224th Coastal Division was based in Nice and assigned to I Army Corps. After the announcement of the Armistice of Cassibile on 8 September 1943 the division was disbanded by invading German forces.

Organization 
 224th Coastal Division - Military Base Nice, in Nice
 165th Coastal Alpini Regiment
 Alpini Battalion "Monte Marmolada" (formed from the XXV Replacements Battalion/ 7th Alpini Regiment)
 Alpini Battalion "Monte Canin" (formed from the XXVI Replacements Battalion/ 8th Alpini Regiment)
 Alpini Battalion "Monte Clapier" (formed from the XXVII Replacements Battalion/ 1st Alpini Regiment)
 DXIII Mobile Territorial Alpini Battalion
 424th Mortar Company (81mm Mod. 35 mortars)
 X Carabinieri Battalion
 104th Bersaglieri Motorcyclists Company
 224th Mixed Engineer Company
 224th Carabinieri Section
 158th Field Post Office
 Division Services

Commanding officers 
The division's commanding officers were:

 Generale di Divisione Luigi Mazzini (1 January 1943 - 25 May 1943)
 Generale di Divisione Giuseppe Andreoli (26 May 1943 - 25 August 1943)
 Generale di Divisione Mario Badino Rossi (26 August 1943 - 9 September 1943)

References 

 
 

Coastal divisions of Italy
Infantry divisions of Italy in World War II